The 1938 VFL Grand Final was an Australian rules football game contested between the Carlton Football Club and Collingwood Football Club, held at the Melbourne Cricket Ground in Melbourne on 24 September 1938. It was the 40th annual Grand Final of the Victorian Football League, staged to determine the premiers for the 1938 VFL season. The match was won by Carlton by a margin of 15 points, marking that club's sixth premiership victory and first since winning the 1915 VFL Grand Final.

This Grand Final was attended by 96,486 spectators, setting a new record as the largest crowd to have witnessed a premiership decider in VFL Grand Final history, and breaking the previous year's record by eight thousand. The ground was not large enough to accommodate the crowd comfortably – the Health Department had previously advised 84,000 as a maximum capacity – and the fence in front of the scoreboard collapsed under the strain before the game, resulting in some spectators watching the game from between the fence and the boundary line. The record crowd stood for 18 years and remained the record for the MCG under its configuration at the time; the record was broken by the attendance at the 1956 VFL Grand Final after the construction of the Olympic Stand that year.

Teams

 Umpire - Bill Blackburn

Statistics

Goalkickers

See also
 1938 VFL season

References

AFL Tables: 1938 Grand Final

External links
Games you may have missed: State Library of Victoria Australian Rules research guide

VFL/AFL Grand Finals
Grand
Carlton Football Club
Collingwood Football Club
September 1938 sports events